"If You've Got the Money (I've Got the Time)" is a debut song co-written and recorded by American country music artist Lefty Frizzell, released on September 14, 1950. The song is the second song recorded by Lefty Frizzell during his first session with Columbia Records in July 1950. The song rose to number one.

Recording and composition
During a show there, Jim Beck, owner of a local recording studio, was starting to take notice of Frizzell. Beck had deals with several major record producing labels and maintained connections with the many publishers. Impressed with Frizzell's performance, he invited him to make a free demo at the studio. In April 1950, he cut several demos of Frizzell singing his own songs, including "If You've Got the Money (I've Got the Time)", which Beck took to Nashville where he pitched it to Little Jimmy Dickens, who disliked the song. However, Columbia Records producer Don Law heard the cut and liked it. After hearing Frizzell in concert, he signed the singer and recorded him for the first time.

The first session was held on July 25, 1950 in the Jim Beck Studio in Dallas, Texas. There he recorded four songs, the first: "I Love You a Thousand Ways", which was written by Frizzell as a letter to his newly wed wife, when he was jailed in 1947 for having sex with an underage girl. The next cut was "If You've Got the Money", a honky-tonk tune written by Frizzell and Frizzell's then manager and studio owner, Jim Beck. The songs were released together as a double-sided single on September 14, 1950.

Personnel
 Lefty Frizzell
 Norman Stevens
 Jimmie Curtis
 Bobby Williamson
 Pee Wee Stewart
 Madge Sutee

Success
The single stayed at number one for three weeks on the Most Played C&W Jukebox Records and peaked at number two on the C&W Best Seller list.  The Frizzell recording spent 22 weeks on the country chart.

Cover versions
In 1950, June Hutton recorded a version with the Lee Gordon Singers (Decca 27329).
In 1971, Mose Allison recorded a version on his album, Western Man.
In 1976, Gary Stewart recorded it to his album, Steppin' Out.
In 1976, Willie Nelson took his version to number one on the country chart, where it was his second solo release to reach the top slot.
In 2001, Merle Haggard recorded a version on his album, Roots, Volume 1.
In 2012, it appeared on The Little Willies album, For the Good Times.

References

1950 debut singles
1950 singles
1976 singles
1950 songs
Lefty Frizzell songs
Willie Nelson songs
Merle Haggard songs
Songs written by Lefty Frizzell
Columbia Records singles
Song recordings produced by Don Law